Kiletangen Ice Tongue is a narrow projection of the ice shelf on the east side of Tangekilen Bay, along the coast of Queen Maud Land, Antarctica. It was first mapped by Norwegian cartographers from aerial photographs taken by the Lars Christensen Expedition, 1936–37, and named Kiletangen (the bay tongue).

References

Ice tongues of Antarctica
Bodies of ice of Queen Maud Land
Princess Ragnhild Coast